The women's points race competition at the 2018 UEC European Track Championships was held on 4 August 2018.

Results
100 laps (25 km) were raced with 10 sprints.

References

Women's points race
European Track Championships – Women's points race